The Houses of Parliament (Privileges and Powers) Act 1952, is a Malaysian laws which enacted relating to the powers and privileges of the Houses of Parliament, freedom of speech and debate or proceedings in such Houses and protection to persons employed in the publication of papers of such Houses.

Structure
The Houses of Parliament (Privileges and Powers) Act 1952, in its current form (1 January 2006), consists of only 34 sections and no schedule (including no amendment), without separate Parts.
 Section 1: Short title
 Section 2: Interpretation
 Section 3: Freedom of speech and debate
 Section 4: Power of House to enquire into contraventions
 Section 5: House as a court of record
 Section 6: Members and officers of House exempted from serving as jurors or assessors or, when House is sitting, to attend as witnesses in court
 Section 7: Immunity of members from civil or criminal proceedings for anything done or said before the House
 Section 8: Exemption from liability in damages for any act done under the authority of the House
 Section 9: Power of House to punish for contempt of the House
 Section 10: No member to vote on matters in which he has a direct pecuniary interest
 Section 11: Power of President to issue warrants for apprehension and imprisonment
 Section 12: Contents of warrant
 Section 13: Power of President to order arrest of persons causing disturbance during sitting of House
 Section 14: Duty to assist in the apprehension of persons ordered to be arrested by the President
 Section 15: Power to enter and search premises
 Section 16: Power of House to order attendance of witnesses and production of documents
 Section 17: Attendance to be notified by summons
 Section 18: Examination of witnesses upon oath
 Section 19: Exemption from answering questions or producing documents
 Section 20: Punishment for giving a false answer
 Section 21: Rules relating to privileged evidence apply to evidence before the House
 Section 22: Certificate by President that a witness has answered questions put to him by the House
 Section 23: Prohibition to give evidence outside the House of any evidence before the House without the leave of the House
 Section 24: Journals of the House admissible as evidence
 Section 25: Penalty for printing false copy of law, report, etc.
 Section 26: Certificate of President a defence in proceedings instituted in respect of publications of the House
 Section 27: Privileged publications
 Section 28: President to act notwithstanding dissolution or prorogation of House
 Section 29: Additional penalty by the House
 Section 30: Recovery of penalties
 Section 31: Prosecutions to be instituted only at the instance of the Attorney General
 Section 32: Privileges and immunities of the House of Commons to be enjoyed by the House and members thereof
 Section 33: Privileges, etc., to be judicially noticed
 Section 34: Commons Journals to be prima facie evidence in enquiries touching privileges

References

External links
 Houses of Parliament (Privileges and Powers) Act 1952 

1952 in Malaya
Legal history of British Malaya
1952 in law
Malaysian federal legislation